Headless Heroes of the Apocalypse is an album of American soul music by artist Eugene McDaniels, released in 1971.

Overview
The album is dedicated to Roberta Flack who is credited: "Special thanks to Miss Roberta Flack for not being afraid to help a brother. She, in my opinion, is a lady of quality, grace, humanity and talent of the highest order. I love you, Bert-G."

This album dabbles in form between soul, funk, jazz, and even folk. In addition, it has been a collector's item among rap music and rare groove enthusiasts since the early 90s when several of the songs were sampled by many hip hop producers including Pete Rock, Q-Tip, Beastie Boys and later Earl Sweatshirt.

Aloe Blacc performed the album in its entirety at the Montreux Jazz Festival 2018.

Track listing
All tracks composed by Eugene McDaniels; except where noted.
 "The Lord Is Back" (McDaniels, Dwight Singleton) - 3:19
 "Jagger the Dagger" – 6:02
 "Lovin' Man" – 4:47
 "Headless Heroes" – 3:32
 "Susan Jane" – 2:10
 "Freedom Death Dance" – 4:16
 "Supermarket Blues" – 4:08
 "The Parasite (For Buffy)" – 9:36

Personnel
Harry Whitaker - piano, musical director
Gary King - electric bass
Miroslav Vitouš - acoustic bass
Alphonse Mouzon - drums
Richard Resnicoff - guitar
Carla Cargill - female vocals
Technical
Lew Hahn - recording and remixing engineer
Patrick Roques - art direction and design
Bill Del Conte - photography
Harvey Konigsberg - samurai painting

External links
 The Headless Heroes of the Apocalypse at All About Jazz
 [ The Headless Heroes of the Apocalypse] at Allmusic

1971 albums
Gene McDaniels albums
Albums produced by Joel Dorn
Atlantic Records albums